Susuman is a town and the administrative center of Susumansky District in Magadan Oblast, Russia, located on the Byoryolyokh River,  northwest of Magadan, the administrative center of the oblast. Population:

Geography
The town lies in the Upper Kolyma region near where the Susuman River joins the Byoryolyokh. The town sits on the M56 Kolyma Highway, an unsealed track often known as the "Road of Bones", which connects Yakutsk with Magadan.

History
It was founded in 1936 as a settlement of a sovkhoz called Susuman, named after the nearby river of the same name. In 1938, the settlement was greatly expanded to become a center of gold mining in the western part of what is now Magadan Oblast under the control of Dalstroy.

Gold mining and other industrial operations in the region were largely reliant on corrective labor camps of the Gulag system, with a large number operating in Susuman's vicinity. From 1949 until 1956, Susuman was the base for one of the Soviet Union's largest corrective labor camps, the Zaplag of the Dalstroy program. During this time, up to 16,500 prisoners were kept in the camps.

Susuman was granted town status in 1964. In the post-Soviet period, the population dropped significantly, from a high of around 18,000 inhabitants in 1991, down to 5,855 as of the 2010 Census.

Climate
Susuman has an extreme dry-winter subarctic climate (Köppen climate classification Dwd/Dwc) with extremely cold, dry winters and short, very mild summers. It is one of the coldest permanently inhabited settlements in the world, with yearly mean temperature of

Administrative and municipal status
Within the framework of administrative divisions, Susuman serves as the administrative center of Susumansky District, to which it is directly subordinated. As a municipal division, the town of Susuman is incorporated within Susumansky Municipal District as Susuman Urban Settlement.

Economy
The town's economy relies mainly on its status as one of the centers of gold mining in the Kolyma region.

Transportation
The town is served by the Susuman Airport, with four flights a week from Magadan.

Documentary
Susuman and its nearby Dalstroy goldmine is portrayed in the prizewinning documentary on the Gulag in the far east of Siberia GOLD Lost in Siberia (VPRO/The Netherlands 1994) YouTube: [* www.imdb.com  by a Dutch filmteam, led by author Gerard Jacobs and filmmaker Theo Uittenbogaard

References

Notes

Sources

External links
Official website of Susuman 
Unofficial website of Susuman 
 Documentary  *** GOLD*** - lost in Siberia  by Gerard Jacobs and Theo Uittenbogaard (VPRO/The Netherlands/1994) was filmed in the summer of 1993 in Magadan, along the Road of Bones, through Ust-Umshug and Susuman and at the Sverovostok Zoloto gold mine, Siberia, by the first foreign film crew ever, visiting the Kolyma District -which had been under control of the Soviet secret service, under the company name Dalstroj, for over 60 years.

Cities and towns in Magadan Oblast
Cities and towns built in the Soviet Union
Populated places established in 1936
1936 establishments in the Soviet Union